The Cungrișoara is a left tributary of the river Olt in Romania. It flows into the Olt near Cucueți.

References

Rivers of Romania
Rivers of Olt County